John J. Chirico (born August 15, 1965) is a former American football running back who played for the New York Jets of the National Football League (NFL). He played college football at Columbia University.

References 

Living people
Columbia Lions football players
1965 births
American football running backs
New York Jets players
Chaminade High School alumni